Mamuras is a town and a former municipality in Lezhë County, northwestern Albania. At the 2015 local government reform it became a subdivision of the municipality Kurbin. The population at the 2011 census was 15,284.

References

External links 
ALBoZONE: Cities of Albania

Former municipalities in Lezhë County
Administrative units of Kurbin
Towns in Albania